Thomas J. Smith was a United States Army soldier who received the Medal of Honor.

Biography
Smith was born in England (or Boston, Massachusetts) and was a private in Troop G, 1st U.S. Cavalry.

He was awarded the Medal of Honor on 14 February 1870 for gallantry in action in a battle at the Chiricahua Mountains in Arizona on 20 October 1869.  He was one of 32 soldiers to receive the Medal of Honor for that battle.

His Medal of Honor was credited to Fort Adams in Newport, Rhode Island.  It is possible that Smith enlisted at Fort Adams.

Private Smith's later life and place of burial are unknown.

Citation
Medal of Honor citation:

"Gallantry in action."

See also
List of Medal of Honor recipients for the Indian Wars

American Indian Wars recipients of the Medal of Honor
United States Army Medal of Honor recipients
United States Army soldiers
Year of birth missing
Year of death missing